Allensville is an unincorporated community in Berkeley County in the U.S. state of West Virginia's Eastern Panhandle. It is located on Allensville Road (West Virginia Secondary Route 3/2) to the east of Back Creek shortly before its confluence with the Potomac River. The claypits in North Mountain along the old Baltimore and Ohio Railroad mainline lie to the southeast of Allensville.

Unincorporated communities in Berkeley County, West Virginia
Unincorporated communities in West Virginia